Mayumi Asano (born 27 June 1976) is a Japanese archer. She competed in the women's individual event at the 2000 Summer Olympics.

References

External links
 

1976 births
Living people
Japanese female archers
Olympic archers of Japan
Archers at the 2000 Summer Olympics
Place of birth missing (living people)
Archers at the 2002 Asian Games
Archers at the 2006 Asian Games
Asian Games competitors for Japan
21st-century Japanese women